The 2004 Ohio State Buckeyes football team represented Ohio State University during the 2004 NCAA Division I-A football season.  The team's head football coach was Jim Tressel.  The Buckeyes played their home games at Ohio Stadium. The team finished the season with a record of 8–4 and a Big Ten Conference record of 4–4.

Schedule

Roster

Coaching staff
 Jim Tressel – Head Coach (4th year)
 Jim Bollman – Offensive Line/OC (4th year)
 Bill Conley – Recruiting Coordinator (18th year)
 Joe Daniels – Quarterbacks / Passing Game Coordinator (4th year)
Ryan Smith- Co-Quarterbacks (1st year)
 Luke Fickell – Defensive Linebackers (4th year)
 Darrell Hazell – Wide Receivers (1st year)
 Jim Heacock – Defensive Line (9th year)
 Mark Snyder – Defensive Coordinator (4th year)
 Dick Tressel – Running Backs (4th year)
 Mel Tucker – Co-Defensive Coordinator / Defensive Backs (4th year)
 Bob Tucker – Director of Football Operations (10th year)

Depth chart

Q

2005 NFL draftees

Game summaries

Cincinnati

Marshall

Michigan

Source:

Alamo Bowl

Source:

Rankings

References

Ohio State
Ohio State Buckeyes football seasons
Alamo Bowl champion seasons
Ohio State Buckeyes football